The southern silvery kingfisher (Ceyx argentatus) is a species of bird in the family Alcedinidae that is endemic to the Philippines found in Mindanao and Basilan. This species and the northern silvery kingfisher, found in the Visayas, were formerly considered conspecific and called the silvery kingfisher.Its natural habitats are tropical moist lowland forests, streams and rivers.. It is threatened by habitat loss.

In the Philippines, it is called kasay-kasay, and figures in the legend concerning the discovery of the Catholic image of Our Lady of Caysasay.

Description 
EBird describes the bird as "A small, dashing kingfisher of forested lowland and foothill streams and ponds on Mindanao and neighboring islands. Overall dark blue in color, slightly paler below, with a white throat and belly, a white patch behind the cheek, and a white spot behind the nostril. Note the pale silvery-blue stripe down the back to the tail, the whitish flecks on the head and wing, and the bright red legs. Unmistakable. Voice is a simple, high-pitched “tseep,” often given in flight.

It is differentiated from its northern counterpart by its bluish-white throat, cheek and belly versus the cream-coloured parts of the Northern silvery kingfisher.

Habitat and Conservation Status 
It appears to be reliant upon forested streams below 1,000 m  and will tolerate secondary and selectively logged forest and even streamside vegetation within coconut plantations, close to forest edge.

IUCN has assessed this bird as near threatened with the population being estimated at 1,500 to 7,000 mature individuals. This species' main threat is habitat loss with wholesale clearance of forest habitats as a result of logging, agricultural conversion and mining activities occurring within the range.

Extensive lowland deforestation throughout its range is the chief threat. Most remaining lowland forest is leased to logging concessions or mining applications. Watercourses with high siltation loads, resulting from deforestation, appear not to hold the species, and riverine pollution is likely to have a similar impact. Forest at Bislig (Mindanao) is being cleared under concession and re-planted with exotic trees for paper production. Conversion of terminalia forest into rice fields and oil palm plantation is driving habitat loss elsewhere.

References

Collar, N.J. 2011. Species limits in some Philippine birds including the Greater Flameback Chrysocolaptes lucidus. Forktail number 27: 29–38.

southern silvery kingfisher
Birds of Mindanao
Endemic birds of the Philippines
southern silvery kingfisher
southern silvery kingfisher
Taxonomy articles created by Polbot